The Dream with Roy and HG was a sports/comedy talk show, broadcast every night during the Sydney 2000 and Athens 2004 Olympics, presented by Australian comedy duo Roy and HG.

Their telecasts became one of the most popular events of the Games, with Olympians from all nations queueing up to appear. The gifts given to interviewees became some of the most valuable collectors' items of the Games.

Due to the attention on Australia as the host nation, the 2000 season took the form of a two-hour show and was made available to Olympic broadcasters internationally; the 2004 season was a one-hour show broadcast in Australia only.

The pair became well known for their commentary of certain events, particularly the men's gymnastics. Speaking with mock-seriousness, Roy and H.G. used fictitious terminology to describe various manoeuvres. Such coined terms included adapted vernacular such as "battered sav" and "Chiko Roll", and other inventions like "flat bag", "Dutch wink", "crazy date" and "hello boys" that became familiar to viewers worldwide. Roy and H.G. also interspersed their commentary with made-up "facts" about the competitors, such as their occupation and pre-match preparation routines. Other running jokes included showing slow-motion clips of Greco-Roman wrestling accompanied by raunchy Barry White music and the very snugly fitting outfits worn by the male Rowing teams.

They also popularised Fatso the Fat-Arsed Wombat as their mascot, dismissing the official mascots as "Olly, Millie, and Dickhead". This was emphasised in a satirical diving contest between Fatso, the three official mascots, and the Boxing Kangaroo later in the Games. Fatso's huge popularity during the series caused consternation with the Australian Olympic Committee, who at first tried to ban the character from Olympic events after Australian athletes appeared carrying Fatso dolls at medal ceremonies. When auctioned for charity at the end of the series, Fatso was purchased by Seven Network CEO Kerry Stokes for A$80,450. A statue of Fatso was later erected at the Olympic Park site.

Insulting New Zealanders, particularly by way of the medal tally, was also a favourite pastime of Roy. When New Zealand won their first gold of the Games in the rowing, he remarked: "And New Zealanders perform at their best when they're sitting down going backwards." During the 2004 season, Norway was insulted frequently, along with New Zealanders, as was former Olympic host city Atlanta, which Roy regularly denounced as "the toilet".

Spin-off shows

The show's popularity during the 2000 season prompted the creation of two spin-off shows, broadcast in Australia only—The Ice Dream during the 2002 Winter Olympics in Salt Lake City, and The Cream, during the 2003 Rugby World Cup. The show's success also spawned The Monday Dump, a weekly sports/talk show with a similar format but lacking the central focus of a single sporting event.

Awards
In 2001, the show won Most Popular Sports Program at the Logies. In 2005, the show was nominated for the same category.

See also 
 Australia at the Olympics

External links
  (2000)
  (2004)
 newspaper comment.
 The Official Anthem of the Smiggins Hole 2010 Bid - Unleash the Mighty Mongrel - By Sean Peter
The Dream at the National Film and Sound Archive

Australian comedy television series
Seven Network original programming
2000 Australian television series debuts
2004 Australian television series endings
Olympics on Australian television
2000 Summer Olympics
2004 Summer Olympics
Australian sports television series